Boron pnictide can refer to any of the following materials:

Normal boron pnictides:
Boron nitride, BN
Boron phosphide, BP
Boron arsenide, BAs

Boron subpnictides:
Boron subphosphide, B12P2
Boron subarsenide, B12As2